Augustdorf is a municipality in the Lippe district of North Rhine-Westphalia, Germany. It has an area of 42.18 km² and about 10,100 inhabitants (2020).

History
In 1775 Simon August, Count of Lippe-Detmold issued a writ of lease (Meierbrief) for the area of today's Augustdorf in favour of August Simon Struß, permitting him to establish a settlement (colony) at Dören hill. In 1779 the actual development plan for the settlement was decided, but the place hardly developed. In 1780 the settlement at Dören consisted of only four tiny thatched huts. In 1789 the settlement was named in honour of Count Simon August.

References

External links
 Official website 

Lippe
Principality of Lippe